Ochlochaete is a genus of green algae in the family Ulvaceae.

References

External links

Ulvaceae
Ulvophyceae genera